Pulau Ayu, often called Pulau Aju, Ayau or simply Ajoe, is a small Indonesian island located in the Ayu Islands above the northern tip of the Waigeo Islands.

Pulau Ayu is part of the Raja Ampat regency of the Southwest Papua geographical and administrative region of Indonesia.

The two major settlements on the island include Imbik Kuan and Ayu.

The island is surrounded by two large reefs.

Pulau Reni and Pulau Kanobe are two other small inhabited islands north of Pulau Ayu.

Access to the island is limited to small boats due to the reefs and the small size of the island.

World War II
Pulau Ayu and all the islands in the Ayu Archipelago were occupied by the Japanese Empire during World War II from 1942 until the end of the war in 1945.

External links

 Pulau Ayu Information
 Detailed Map

Raja Ampat Islands
Islands of Indonesia